Patricia Mantey  (born 27 September 1992) is a Ghanaian footballer who plays as a goalkeeper for the Ghana women's national football team. She was part of the team at the 2014 African Women's Championship. On club level she played for Immigration Accra in Ghana. In 2020, she signed for NWFL Premiership side, Rivers Angels F.C.

References

1992 births
Living people
Ghanaian women's footballers
Ghana women's international footballers
Place of birth missing (living people)
Women's association football goalkeepers
Expatriate footballers in Nigeria Women Premier League
Rivers Angels F.C.